Amy Gutman (born 1960) is an American novelist. Born in Ann Arbor, Michigan, she graduated from Harvard College magna cum laude, and thereafter became a journalist, working at the Wilson Quarterly in Washington, DC, and The Tennessean in Nashville, Tennessee. She then worked in several positions for newspapers in Mississippi before co-founding the Mississippi Teacher Corps. She then attended Harvard Law School, graduating in 1993 and working for the firms Cravath, Swaine & Moore and Parcher, Hayes & Snyder in New York City. In 2001, she published her first novel, Equivocal Death. her second, The Anniversary, was published in 2003. She currently works in alumni relations for Harvard Law School.

External links
 
 Books in Fantasticfiction

21st-century American novelists
American women novelists
American women journalists
Harvard Law School alumni
1960 births
Living people
21st-century American women writers
20th-century American journalists
Cravath, Swaine & Moore people
21st-century American non-fiction writers
Harvard College alumni
Writers from Ann Arbor, Michigan
20th-century American women